Crabro cribrarius, common name slender bodied digger wasp, is a species of wasp of the family Crabronidae.

Description
These wasps have a black and yellow body. Males are characterized by conspicuous trowel-like dilatations or fore-tibial shield-like structures used in burrow excavation. The antennae are filiform, with expanded central articles. Tibiae are yellowish-brown and lightly mottled.

Biology
The adults of these solitary wasps feed on nectar of various  of umbellifers (Apiaceae), mainly on Angelica sylvestris, Pastinaca sativa, Heracleum and Daucus carota. They also visit Cirsium arvense. These wasps apparently are single-brooded and fly from early June to early September. They build their nests 15 to 20 centimeters deep in sandy or loamy soil, sometimes in rotten wood. At the end of the burrow they construct one-three cells. Each cell is supplied with five to eight medium preys. Females provisions her larvae with paralysed Pyralis and Diptera of various families (Anthomyiidae, Therevidae, Asilidae, Calliphoridae, Empididae, Syrphidae, Tabanidae).

Distribution

Habitat
These digger wasps colonize dry sandy areas, lowland heaths and coastal dunes, but the can also be found in urban areas, in spruce forest edges, chalk grassland and open woodlands.

Bibliography
 Rolf Witt: Wespen. Beobachten, Bestimmen. Naturbuch-Verlag, Augsburg 1998, .

References

External links
 Eakringbirds
 CHESHIRE HYMENOPTERA (BEES, WASPS AND ANTS)

Crabronidae
Hymenoptera of Asia
Hymenoptera of Europe
Wasps described in 1758
Taxa named by Carl Linnaeus